Greg Brown (born 29 July 1962) is a former footballer who played as striker for both the New Zealand and Australian national football teams.

Club career
Brown played semi-professionally for Mossley, Hyde United and Southport in the United Kingdom before being brought to New Zealand by Napier City Rovers midway through 1985.

Despite being sent off in his club debut, Brown's goalscoring touch immediately turned struggling Napier's season around leading them from the bottom of the New Zealand National Soccer League to 1985 Chatham Cup winners in a final that became known as "Greg Brown's final", in which he scored one goal and set up two others in the 3–1 win over North Shore United. He was named man of the match in the final.

However, with Brown injured, Napier failed to avoid relegation from the national league during the following week's promotion/relegation play-offs and Brown was pursued by several national league clubs, eventually moving to Miramar Rangers for the 1986 season. He was the national league's top scorer for the first half of the 1986 season but hit a dry spell due to injury during the second half.

In February 1986 he was selected in the New Zealand national football team, making four B-international appearances in friendlies against a touring USSR XI.

In 1987, Brown moved across the Tasman to play for the Parramatta Eagles from 1987 to 1992 and the West Adelaide Sharks from 1992 till his retirement from professional football in 1994, aged 32. He was named Australian football player of the year in 1990 and was picked in the Australian national team in 1991, going on to make 12 appearances and scoring one goal.

Managerial career
Brown joined Mitchelton FC in the local Brisbane competition in 1996 and was the club's head coach from 2004 to 2007.

From November 1997 to March 1999, Brown was coach of the Matildas, the Australian national women's team, and took them to a record 14 internationals without a loss. He resigned from the position after the side's poor showing at the World Cup in the United States.

References

External links 
 
 

1962 births
Living people
Association football forwards
Australian soccer players
Australia international soccer players
New Zealand association footballers
Expatriate footballers in South Korea
National Soccer League (Australia) players
Pohang Steelers players
West Adelaide SC players
Australian expatriate sportspeople in South Korea
Napier City Rovers FC players
English expatriate sportspeople in South Korea
Parramatta FC players
Miramar Rangers AFC players
1999 FIFA Women's World Cup managers
Australia women's national soccer team managers
English footballers
Stalybridge Celtic F.C. players
Mossley A.F.C. players
Hyde United F.C. players
Southport F.C. players
Bonnyrigg White Eagles FC players
Mitchelton FC players
English football managers